Ian Parker may refer to:
 Ian Parker (keyboardist) (born 1953), Scottish keyboard player
 Ian Parker (psychologist) (born 1956), British psychologist
 Ian Parker (Canadian pianist) (born 1978)
 Ian Parker (explorer-adventurer) (born 1984), American musician and adventurer
 Kim Ian Parker (born 1956), Canadian religious studies scholar